The 1979 Anambra State gubernatorial election occurred on July 28, 1979. NPP's Jim Nwobodo won election for a first term to become Anambra State's first executive governor by defeating NPN's Christian Onoh, his closest contestant to win the contest.

Jim Nwobodo emerged winner in the NPP gubernatorial primary election. His running mate was Roy Umenyi.

Electoral system
The Governor of Anambra State is elected using the plurality voting system.

Results
There were five political parties registered by the Federal Electoral Commission (FEDECO) participated in the elections. Jim Nwobodo of the NPP won the contest by polling the highest votes, defeating NPN's Christian Onoh.

References 

Anambra State gubernatorial elections
Anambra State Gubernatorial election 1979
Anambra State gubernatorial election